Little Richardson Creek is a  long 3rd order tributary to Richardson Creek in Union County, North Carolina.

Course
Little Richardson Creek rises about 1 mile southeast of Alton, North Carolina and then flows north to join Richardson Creek in Lake Lee southeast of Monroe, North Carolina.

Watershed
Little Richardson Creek drains  of area, receives about 48.6 in/year of precipitation, has a wetness index of 447.78, and is about 41% forested.

References

Rivers of North Carolina
Rivers of Union County, North Carolina